Datun Mountain (Chinese: 大屯山; Pinyin: Dà tún shān) is a mountain located in the Yangmingshan National Park. With a height of 1,092 m (3,583 ft),  it is the park's 3rd tallest mountain and is located in the Tatun Volcano Group. It is one of Taiwan's two active volcanoes, with the other being on Guishan Island off the coast of Yilan.

History
The mountain first erupted 2.5 million years ago, while 700,000 years later, another eruption split the mountain into multiple peaks. The latest eruption occurred 5,000-6,000 years ago.

Climbing
The mountain is accessible via the Datunshan Trail. It has an elevation gain of 247 m (810 ft) and takes around 1.5-2 hours round-trip.

References

 Mountains of Taiwan
Volcanoes of Taiwan
Volcanoes of Asia
Mountains of Asia
Landforms of Taiwan
Landforms of Taipei